Siskiyou monardella is a common name for several plants and may refer to:

Monardella purpurea
Monardella siskiyouensis